The '1981 National Panasonic Series' was an Australian motor racing contest for Formula Pacific and Australian Formula 2 racing cars. It was the inaugural National Panasonic Series.

The series, which was sponsored by National Panasonic, was won by Bruce Allison, driving a Ralt RT4.

Schedule

The series was contested over four rounds with two heats per round.

Points system
"Points" were allocated on a 20-19-18-17-16-15-14-13-12-11-10-9-8-7-6-5-4-3-2-1 basis for the first 20 places in each heat at each round and then aggregated for each driver to determine the actual round placings. Series points were then awarded, on a 9-6-4-3-2-1 basis, for the first six round placings.

Series results

The above table lists only the first three placings in the series.

References

National Panasonic Series